Handsworth Secondary School is a high school in the district of North Vancouver, British Columbia, Canada, and part of School District 44 North Vancouver. As of September 2020, the school reported 1544 students enrolled in Grades 8–12, the largest school in the North Vancouver School District. On January 15, 2018, it was announced that construction of a new school to replace the existing 57 year old building is expected to start in 2019 and began operation on February 7, 2022.

Handsworth Secondary School within proximity to the Upper Mackay Creek Park. It is also located within 5 minutes' drive of Grouse Mountain to the north and the Capilano Suspension Bridge in the south. The school is accessible via Capilano Road, exit 14 off BC Highway 1. The nearest public transit routes are TransLink Buses #232 and #236 which stop at the corner of Capilano and Edgewood Road, a short walk from the school.

Academics
Handsworth offers courses in the humanities, sciences, language arts, business, marketing, fine and performing arts, textiles, woodwork, and computer technology. The performing arts program performs an original play every year and have recently moved their productions from the Cenennial community theatre into a new school theatre.

Handsworth also offers several Advanced Placement courses and exams sittings annually.

Athletics
The school has teams in football, rugby union, rowing, wrestling, volleyball, field hockey, basketball, swimming, mountain biking and soccer.

Every year, the Carson Graham Eagles football team play their rivals, the Handsworth Royals, in the Buchanan Bowl. The very first Buchanan Bowl was played in 1987 and is named after James Buchanan, a teacher and administrator who worked at both schools and died in 1986.

Handsworth won the 2006 BC Senior Boys AAA Basketball Tournament after defeating Kitsilano Secondary School with a score of 82-65. Handsworth was led by former Los Angeles Lakers center Robert Sacre who was named MVP of the game. Sacre contributed 17 points, grabbed 12 rebounds, and blocked four shots that game. That season, he averaged 25 points, 12 rebounds, and four and a half blocks per game. This marks the only tournament victory for Handsworth. Since their lone championship, they’ve been to the tournament 5 more times placing 8th (2008), 9th (2013), and 4th (2020).

Past BC championships include:
2014 - Field Hockey - Senior Girls AAA
2013 - Field Hockey - Senior Girls AAA
2011 - Field Hockey - Senior Girls AAA
2011 - Field Hockey - Senior Girls AAA
2010 – Volleyball – Senior Girls AAA
2010 – Basketball – Senior Girls AAA
2010 – Football – Bantam Boys
2009 – Volleyball – Senior Girls AAA
2009 – Soccer – Senior Girls AAA
2009 – Basketball – Senior Girls AAA
2008 – Volleyball – Senior Girls AAA
2008 – Soccer – Senior Boys AAA
2007 – Football – Senior Boys AA
2007 – Volleyball – Junior Girls AAA
2006 – Soccer – Senior Boys AAA
2006 – Basketball – Senior Boys AAA
1996 – Football – Senior Boys AA
1993 – Volleyball – Senior Girls AAA
1982 – Track and Field – Senior Boys/Girls
1981 – Track and Field (tied with Burnaby Central) – Senior Girls/Boys
1979 – Football – Senior Boys
1973 – Football – Senior Boys
1970 – Football – JV Boys
1970 - Basketball - Bantam Boys

Notable alumni
Darcy James Argue, Grammy nominated composer, bandleader of Secret Society 
Mike Ayley, bass player for Marianas Trench
Cameron Bancroft, actor
Mitch Barnett, Canadian football linebacker
Laila Biali, Juno Award winning pianist, singer-songwriter, host of CBC Radio's Saturday Night Jazz 
Ian Bird, 2-time Olympian
Sarah Chalke, actress
Rebecca Clarke, novelist
Brandi Disterheft, bassist and composer
Norm Fisher, bassist, 14-year member of the Bryan Adams Band
Blythe Hartley, 3-time Olympian and bronze medalist
Martin Jones, professional ice hockey goalie for the San Jose Sharks and 2013-14 Stanley Cup winner
Lise Leveille, Olympian
Mike Mahood, 2-time Olympian
Trevor Martin, 2-time Carleton University Intramural Champion 
Colin McKay, professional skateboarder
Brent McMahon, 2-time Olympian
Peter Milkovich, 2-time Olympian
John JP Poliquin, Juno Award nominated & MMVA winning music video director, filmmaker
John Pyper-Ferguson, actor
Anna Rice, 2-time Olympian
Renee Rosnes, 5-time Juno Award winning pianist, composer and arranger
Robert Sacre, professional basketball player who last played for the NBA's New Orleans Pelicans
Mason Trafford, professional soccer player
 Mike Warren, professional designer and author for maker culture, and New York Times award winning inventor.
Paul Wettlaufer, 2-time Olympian
Connor Weyell, Canadian 2014 Rugby Scrumb Finisher 
Chris Winter, Olympian

References

External links
 http://www.nvsd44.bc.ca/SchoolSites/Handsworth.aspx 

High schools in British Columbia
North Vancouver (district municipality)
Educational institutions in Canada with year of establishment missing